Warragamba is a town in New South Wales, Australia, in Wollondilly Shire. Located on the eastern edge of the Blue Mountains, Warragamba is one and a half hour's drive west of Sydney. The name Warragamba comes from the aboriginal words Warra and Gamba meaning 'water running over rocks'.

History 
In 1804, George William Evans became the first white man to discover the Warragamba River, penetrating upstream to the present site of Warragamba Dam.

However, for Indigenous peoples, the river and the valley were an integral part of daily life, and remain today a significant place of cultural heritage.

Originally constructed as a workers' settlement during the construction of Warragamba Dam, Sydney's primary water source, in the 1940s the modern town of Warragamba remains on the same site adjacent the dam. The town was built from scratch, including homes, shops, schools and other facilities.

On completion of the dam being built many workers bought their homes from the Water Board and stayed on in the township. Warragamba Public School celebrated its fiftieth anniversary in September 1998 despite the fact it was to be demolished after the completion of Warragamba Dam in the 1960s.

Warragamba is unusual for an Australian town, as the streets do not have typical names, but are numbered (such as First Street and Eighteenth Street).

Ongoing dam works (including recent safety improvements) have severely reduced weekend visitors. The town also lost 30 homes and businesses in the 2001 Warragamba bushfires. It was home to African Lion Safari until 1991.

A new Warragamba Dam Visitor Centre and Haviland Park are becoming a popular tourist attractions thanks in part to the excellent picnic facilities.

Heritage listings 
Lake Burragorang Warragamba Dam has a number of heritage-listed sites, including:
 Coxs River Arms: Coxs River track
Warragamba Dam
 Warragamba Dam: Megarritys Bridge
 Warragamba Dam: Warragamba Dam – Haviland Park

Population 
The most common responses for religion were Catholic 31.8%, Anglican 26.4% and No Religion 25.6%.

Popular Culture 

 In Australia, a popular phrase used in pubs and restaurants throughout greater Sydney is Warragamba Slammer. This is used when someone would like a glass of water.

References

External links 

 Warragamba Website – Local and Tourist Information
 Warragamba weather info – Local weather station

 
Towns in New South Wales
Wollondilly Shire